Sir William Drake, 4th Baronet (1658–1716), of Mount Drake, and Ashe House, Musbury, Devon, was an English Tory politician who sat in the English and British House of Commons from 1690 to 1715.

Drake was a younger son of Sir John Drake, 1st Baronet. He matriculated at Oriel College, Oxford in 1675  and was awarded BA in 1679 and  MA in 1683 from Corpus Christi College, Oxford. He was knighted in 1685 and succeeded his brother Bernard as 4th Baronet in 1687.He married in 1687, Judith, the daughter and coheiress of William Eveleigh of Olcomb, Ottery St. Mary, Devon, He inherited Mount Drake and Ashe House from his sister in 1694. and secondly in 1705, Mary, the daughter of Sir Peter Prideaux, 3rd Baronet, of Netherton, Devon.

Drake was a Member of Parliament (MP) for Honiton in 1690–1715 and for Dartmouth in 1713–1715. He was a Lord of the Admiralty in 1710–14.

Drake died in 1716, By his first wife,  he had two sons and three daughters  He was succeeded in the baronetcy by both sons, John and William.

References

1658 births
1716 deaths
People from East Devon District
Alumni of Oriel College, Oxford
Alumni of Corpus Christi College, Oxford
Baronets in the Baronetage of England
English MPs 1690–1695
English MPs 1695–1698
English MPs 1698–1700
English MPs 1701
English MPs 1701–1702
English MPs 1702–1705
English MPs 1705–1707
Members of the Parliament of Great Britain for Honiton
British MPs 1707–1708
British MPs 1708–1710
British MPs 1710–1713
British MPs 1713–1715
Lords of the Admiralty
Knights Bachelor
Members of the Parliament of England (pre-1707) for Honiton